Sir Leslie Cannon CBE (21 February 1920 – 9 December 1970) was a prominent British trade union official and served as General President of the Electrical Trades Union from 1963 to 1970. He was born in Wigan, the son of a coal miner, and became a Communist activist, and trade union leader; member of Electrical Trades Union Executive Council, North Lancashire and Merseyside, 1948–1954. He left the Communist Party of Great Britain in 1956. In 1961 he uncovered an ETU ballot rigging scandal, and successfully sued the union. Cannon became president of the ETU in September 1963, a post left vacant by disgraced former president Frank Foulkes.

In his time as leader of the ETU, he took part in a merger with the plumbers' union to create the EETPU.

Cannon died from cancer, aged 50.

External links
Biography
Catalogue of Cannon's papers at the Modern Records Centre, University of Warwick

1920 births
1970 deaths
General Presidents of the Electrical Trades Union (United Kingdom)
Electrical, Electronic, Telecommunications and Plumbing Union
People from Wigan
Deaths from cancer in England
Knights Bachelor
Communist Party of Great Britain members
Members of the General Council of the Trades Union Congress
Trade unionists from the Metropolitan Borough of Wigan
Commanders of the Order of the British Empire